
Santas Little Helper or Santa's Little Helpers may refer to:

Folk Mythology
Christmas elves who make toys in Santa Claus's workshop

Cartoon characters
Santa's Little Helper, cartoon dog in The Simpsons

Film
Santa's Little Helper (film) (2015), American comedy film
Tom and Jerry: Santa's Little Helpers (2014), animated straight-to-DVD production

Music
Santa's Little Helper (EP) (2012), EP by Jasmine Rae

Television
"Santa's Little Helper", a 1993 episode of the American television show Boy Meets World
"Santa's Little Helpers", a 1998 episode of Boy Meets World
"SANTa's Little Helpers", a 2011 episode of the American television show A.N.T. Farm

Literature
Greg the Sausage Roll: Santa's Little Helper (2021), book by LadBaby